Herb Cox (born 1950 or 1951) is a Canadian politician, who was elected to the Legislative Assembly of Saskatchewan in the 2011 election, representing the electoral district of The Battlefords as a member of the Saskatchewan Party.

Cox served in the cabinet of Premier Brad Wall twice, first as Minister of Environment and later briefly as Minister of Advanced Education.

In 2012, Cox revealed that he had been diagnosed with bone cancer two days after his election victory, and had received chemotherapy treatment for the disease.

References

Living people
People from Battleford
Politicians from Brandon, Manitoba
Saskatchewan Party MLAs
1950s births
21st-century Canadian politicians
Members of the Executive Council of Saskatchewan